The Dirección General de Policía (DIGEPOL) was a Venezuelan police agency. DIGEPOL was created after the transition to democracy following the 1958 fall of the dictatorship of Marcos Pérez Jiménez, replacing in part the old Seguridad Nacional. Allegations of abuse plagued DIGEPOL, most prominently in relation to, according to judicial hearings, the killing and torture of a communist professor by DIGEPOL agents. DIGEPOL was replaced in 1969 by the Dirección de los Servicios de Inteligencia y Prevención (DISIP), under the control of the Interior Ministry.

References

Defunct law enforcement agencies of Venezuela